The Maoist Youth Union (abbreviated UJM) was a youth organization in Spain during the transition to democracy. It was founded as the youth wing of the Workers Revolutionary Organization (ORT) in 1975.

The organization upheld Marxism–Leninism-Mao Zedong Thought.  In March 1975 ORT issued a statement labelled 'A call to the revolutionary youth'. UJM was founded at a conference on November 29, 1975. Faustino Bosquet Villaescusa was elected general secretary of UJM in July 1976.  In the same month, UJM took part in founding the Democratic Platform of Political Youth Forces (along with the Socialist Youth, Communist Youth Union of Spain and the Young Red Guard).

On February 22, 1977 UJM appealed to the government for its legalization. The appeal was presented by Pedro Izquierdo and Fernando Casanova.  UJM demanded that a 'Youth Charter' be included in the new Spanish constitution.

UJM began publishing the bulletin Forja Comunista ('Communist Forge') in January 1976.  It began publishing the journal El Joven Maoista ('The Young Maoist') in 1977.

UJM held its first congress at the Estadio de Vallehermoso in Madrid on January 7–8, 1978. The congress elected a Central Committee and re-elected Faustino Bosquet as general secretary. The congress rejected the Moncloa Pact, urged support for the Sindicato Unitario trade union movement and declared its non-participation in the World Festival of Youth and Students in Havana.  In one of its statements, it declared that North American imperialism and Russian social imperialism were "sworn enemies of the sovereignty and liberty of the peoples", threatening the peoples of the world with the risk of a new world war.

In February 1978 UJM co-signed an appeal against the law decree issued by the government on youth associations. Other signatories included the Socialist Youth, Communist Youth Union of Spain and Nuevas Generaciones.  UJM campaigned for a "Yes" vote in the 1978 constitutional referendum.  In the spring of 1979 the UJM office in Madrid was targeted twice in Molotov cocktail attacks.

UJM held its second congress in April 1980.  The organization later disappeared.

Bibliography

Notes

References
 - Total pages: 559

 - Total pages: 409

 - Total pages: 159 

 - Total pages: 15

Organizations established in 1975
Youth wings of political parties in Spain
Youth wings of communist parties